The women's road race B cycling event at the 2020 Summer Paralympics took place on 3 September 2021 at Fuji Speedway in Shizuoka Prefecture. 7  riders (and pilots) competed in the event.

The B classification is for cyclists with visual impairment. Sighted guides act as pilots in these events, which take place on tandem bikes.

Results
The event took place on 3 September 2021 at 13:00.

References

Women's road race B